Tas Kand (also Romanized as Ţās Kand, Ţāskand, and Tās Kand) is a village in Karaftu Rural District, in the Central District of Takab County, West Azerbaijan Province, Iran. At the 2006 census, its population was 181, in 31 families.

References 

Populated places in Takab County